Pinky candy is a brand of mint-flavored candy sold by Frente International (now Koikeya).  Flavors currently available in the new rectangular packaging are peach, grape, tropical and pine, and grapefruit, Coke, and soda; Pinky also comes in a smaller, rounded container.  Pinky is known largely for its monkey mascot named Pinky Monkey (ピンキー　モンキー).

References

External links
 Frente Spiral
 Frente International - Pinky

Japanese brand foods
Brand name confectionery